The New Mexico meridian, is longitude 106° 53′ 40″ west from Greenwich. It extends throughout New Mexico and into Colorado, and together with the baseline, at latitude 34° 15′ 25″ north, governs township and range surveys in New Mexico, except those in the northwest corner of the state which refer to the Navajo meridian and baseline. The New Mexico meridian and Baseline also provide the basis for township and range surveys in the upper valley of the Rio Grande del Norte in Colorado.

This meridian was established in 1855 by John W. Garretson, a surveyor for the U.S. government.

See also
List of principal and guide meridians and base lines of the United States

Notes

External links

Meridians and base lines of the United States
Named meridians
Geography of New Mexico
Geography of Colorado